"I.G.Y. (What a Beautiful World)" is a song written and performed by American songwriter, singer and musician Donald Fagen. It was the first track on his platinum-certified debut solo album The Nightfly, and was released in September 1982 as its first single.  It charted within the top 30 on the Billboard Hot 100, Mainstream Rock, R&B Singles and Adult Contemporary charts.

Background 
Fagen, along with musician Walter Becker, led the rock band Steely Dan during the 1970s. Between 1972 and 1981, Steely Dan had ten Top-40 singles, including the top-ten hits "Do It Again" (1972), "Rikki Don't Lose That Number" (1974) and "Hey Nineteen" (1980).
In 1981 Becker and Fagen parted ways. Fagen's first album as a solo artist, The Nightfly, was released the next year.

Title and lyrics 
The "I.G.Y." of the title refers to the "International Geophysical Year", an event that ran from July 1957 to December 1958. The I.G.Y. was an international scientific project promoting collaboration among the world's scientists. Fagen's lyrics discuss the widespread optimistic vision of the future at that time, including futuristic concepts such as solar-powered cities, a transatlantic tunnel, permanent space stations, and spandex jackets.

The song references the vision of postwar optimism in America and the Western world. The "76" referred to in the song is 1976, the U.S. Bicentennial year.

Chart performance and accolades 
"I.G.Y." debuted on the Billboard Hot 100 on October 9, 1982, at number 56. It reached the top 40 on October 30 and eventually peaked at number 26 on November 27, 1982. It also reached number 8 on Billboard Adult Contemporary chart, number 17 on Billboard Mainstream Rock chart, and number 54 on Billboard R&B Singles chart. It was Fagen's only solo Top 40 hit on the Billboard Hot 100 chart.

It was nominated for the Grammy Award for Song of the Year in 1983, losing to "Always on My Mind".

Cover versions  
"I.G.Y." has been covered by British singer and musician Howard Jones, who included a version on his 1993 greatest hits album The Best of Howard Jones.

The gospel a cappella group Take 6 covered "I.G.Y." as the title track on their 2002 release Beautiful World. The lyrics of Fagen's original song were modified to recast the song with a gospel message.

In 2004 Marcia Hines recorded a version for her album Hinesight.

Personnel 

Donald Fagen – vocals, synthesizer, synth-harmonica
Greg Phillinganes – electric piano
Rob Mounsey – synthesizer, horn arrangement
Anthony Jackson – bass
Hugh McCracken – guitar
James Gadson – drums
Jeff Porcaro – additional drums
Roger Nichols – drum/percussion programming
Starz Vanderlocket – percussion
Randy Brecker – trumpet
Dave Tofani – alto saxophone
Michael Brecker – tenor saxophone
Ronnie Cuber – baritone saxophone
Dave Bargeron – trombone
Valerie Simpson, Zack Sanders, Frank Floyd, Gordon Grody – backing vocals

Charts

In popular culture 
The song was also used in a scene from the Simpsons sixteenth-season episode "Future Drama" when Homer and Bart are flying around in the 'imperfect Hovercar'.

French DJ Producer Alan Braxe sampled this song for the remix on Benjamin Diamond's "In Your Arms (We Gonna Make It)".

See also
United States in the 1950s
World's fair

References

External links 
 Lyrics of this song
 

Songs about science
1982 singles
1982 songs
Songs written by Donald Fagen
Warner Records singles
Song recordings produced by Gary Katz
Works set in the 1950s